The elm cultivar Ulmus 'Hertfordensis Latifolia' was mentioned (as Ulmus campestris hertfordensis latifolia) by Boulger in Gardener's Chronicle II. 12: 298 1879, but without description.

Description
Loudon earlier described it as "the broad-leaved Hertfordshire Elm" in Arboretum et Fruticetum Britannicum, 3: 1396 1838. Considered "probably U. carpinifolia" (:U. minor) by Green. Loudon also distinguished a narrow-leaved Hertfordshire elm, U. 'Hertfordensis Angustifolia'.

Pests and diseases
Though susceptible to Dutch Elm Disease, field elms (see Green's conjecture above) and their hybrids produce suckers and usually survive in this form in their area of origin.

Cultivation
The Woodland Trust records a small number of mature U. minor surviving in Hertfordshire.

Synonymy
Ulmus campestris hertfordensis latifolia: Boulger, in Gardener's Chronicle II. 12: 298 1879.

References

Elm cultivars
Ulmus articles missing images
Ulmus